Afroz Shah is an Indian environmental activist and lawyer from Mumbai. He is best known for organizing the world's largest beach clean-up project, which has grown into a movement that has inspired people around the world to clean up their surrounding environment.

In 2016, Shah was named by the United Nations as a Champion of the Earth for leading the clean-up of Mumbai's Versova Beach. Shah partnered with the Dawoodi Bohra's Turning the Tide campaign to remove plastic from the Mithi river and Dana Pani beach in Mumbai. Inspired by Afroz Shah's effort to clean beaches in Mumbai, the United Nations Environment Program launched the Clean Seas campaign globally. Afroz Shah has won the CNN Heroes of the Year Award−2019.

Awards and honors
 United Nations Champion of the Earth Award 2016
 CNN-News18 Indian of the Year 2017
 CNN named him amongst its list of Top 10 Heroes of Year 2019
 GQ awarded the trophy for Eco Warrior of the Year 2019

PM of India Narendra Modi praised Shah's work for transforming Versova beach from filth and garbage to clean and beautiful during the radio programme 'Mann ki baat' on 28 May 2017.

References

External links
 

Year of birth missing (living people)
Living people
People from Mumbai
21st-century Indian lawyers
Indian environmentalists